Greeley Center, often shortened to simply Greeley, is a village in and the county seat of Greeley County, Nebraska, United States. The population was 466 at the 2010 census.

History
Greeley Center was established as a town in the late 1880s when the Chicago, Burlington and Quincy Railroad was extended to that point. It was named from its position near the geographical center of Greeley county.

In 1890, the seat of Greeley County was transferred to Greeley Center from Scotia.

Geography
Greeley Center is located at  (41.548099, -98.530862).

Climate

Demographics

2010 census
As of the census of 2010, there were 466 people, 204 households, and 116 families residing in the village. The racial makeup of the village was 98.9% White and 1.1% from two or more races. Hispanic or Latino of any race were 2.6% of the population.

There were 204 households, of which 21.6% had children under the age of 18 living with them, 48.0% were married couples living together, 7.4% had a female householder with no husband present, 1.5% had a male householder with no wife present, and 43.1% were non-families. 40.2% of all households were made up of individuals, and 20.1% had someone living alone who was 65 years of age or older. The average household size was 2.14 and the average family size was 2.92.

The median age in the village was 49.8 years. 20.4% of residents were under the age of 18; 6.7% were between the ages of 18 and 24; 17% were from 25 to 44; 29.6% were from 45 to 64; and 26.4% were 65 years of age or older. The gender makeup of the village was 50.6% male and 49.4% female.

2000 census
As of the census of 2000, there were 527 people, 213 households, and 128 families residing in the village. The population density was 844.5 people per square mile (325.4/km). There were 238 housing units at an average density of 378.5 per square mile (145.9/km). The racial makeup of the village was 99.06% White, 0.19% African American, 0.38% Asian, 0.19% from other races, and 0.19% from two or more races. Hispanic or Latino of any race were 0.19% of the population.

There were 213 households, out of which 28.6% had children under the age of 18 living with them, 47.4% were married couples living together, 8.9% had a female householder with no husband present, and 39.9% were non-families. 39.0% of all households were made up of individuals, and 23.9% had someone living alone who was 65 years of age or older. The average household size was 2.35 and the average family size was 3.16.

In the village, the population was spread out, with 27.7% under the age of 18, 5.5% from 18 to 24, 20.9% from 25 to 44, 20.2% from 45 to 64, and 25.8% who were 65 years of age or older. The median age was 42 years. For every 100 females, there were 90.3 males. For every 100 females age 18 and over, there were 84.6 males.

The median income for a household in the village was $31,667, and the median income for a family was $43,036. Males had a median income of $25,000 versus $20,875 for females. The per capita income for the village was $15,791. About 6.4% of families and 10.3% of the population were below the poverty line, including 18.8% of those under age 18 and 6.8% of those age 65 or over.

Notable native 
Maurice Lukefahr - Pioneering researcher in the fields of host plant resistance and environmental control of cotton insect pests.

References

External links
Greeley County cemeteries

Villages in Greeley County, Nebraska
Villages in Nebraska
County seats in Nebraska